David Drew may refer to:

 David Drew (politician) (born 1952), British politician and member of Parliament, current vice chairman of Forest Green Rovers
 David Drew (dancer) (1938–2015), English ballet dancer and member of the Royal Ballet
 David Drew (paediatrician), English paediatrician
 David Drew (music critic) (1930–2009), British musicologist and editor
 David Drew (umpire) (1919–1976), South African cricket umpire

See also
 J. D. Drew (David Jonathan Drew, born 1975), Major League Baseball player